Sidney Harold Fry (1869 – 3 September 1961) was an English amateur billiards and snooker player and amateur golfer.

He won the English Amateur Billiards Championship eight times between 1893 and 1925 and the English Amateur Snooker Championship in 1919, becoming the first player to win both titles. He was the author of "Billiards for amateurs".

In golf he was runner-up in the Amateur Championship in 1902 and twice runner-up in the Irish Amateur Open Championship. He was a regular competitor in the Amateur Championship, playing 25 times between 1898 and 1931. He finished 14th in the 1902 Open Championship at Royal Liverpool Golf Club.

Results in major championships

Note: Fry only played in The Open Championship and The Amateur Championship.

NT = No tournament
WD = withdrew
CUT = missed the half-way cut
R256, R128, R64, R32, R16, QF, SF = Round in which player lost in match play

Source for British Open: www.theopen.com

Source for 1898 British Amateur: The Glasgow Herald, 27 May 1898, pg. 11.

Source for 1899 British Amateur: The Glasgow Herald, 25 May 1899, pg. 7.

Source for 1901 British Amateur: The Glasgow Herald, 9 May 1901, pg. 10.

Source for 1903 British Amateur: The Glasgow Herald, 20 May 1903, pg. 13.

Source for 1904 British Amateur: The Glasgow Herald, 1 Jun 1904, pg. 11.

Source for 1905 British Amateur: The Glasgow Herald, 24 May 1905, pg. 12.

Source for 1906 British Amateur: The Glasgow Herald, 24 May 1906, pg. 8.

Source for 1907 British Amateur: The Glasgow Herald, 29 May 1907, pg. 12.

Source for 1908 British Amateur: The Glasgow Herald, 27 May 1908, pg. 14.

Source for 1909 British Amateur: The Glasgow Herald, 26 May 1909, pg. 14.

Source for 1910 British Amateur: The Glasgow Herald, 1 Jun 1910, pg. 10.

Source for 1911 British Amateur: The Glasgow Herald, 1 Jun 1911, pg. 10.

Source for 1912 British Amateur: The American Golfer, July, 1912, pg. 198.

Source for 1913 British Amateur: The Glasgow Herald, 27 May 1913, pg. 14.

Source for 1914 British Amateur: The Glasgow Herald, 20 May 1914, pg. 12.

Source for 1920 British Amateur: The Glasgow Herald, 8 Jun 1920, pg. 12.

Source for 1921 British Amateur: The Glasgow Herald, 24 May 1921, pg. 3.

Source for 1922 British Amateur: The Glasgow Herald, 26 May 1922, pg. 12.

Source for 1923 British Amateur: The Glasgow Herald, 9 May 1923, pg. 13.

Source for 1927 British Amateur: The Glasgow Herald, 24 May 1927, pg. 10.

Source for 1928 British Amateur: The Glasgow Herald, 24 May 1928, pg. 3.

Source for 1931 British Amateur: The Glasgow Herald, 19 May 1931, pg. 17.

Team appearances
England–Scotland Amateur Match (representing England): 1902, 1903 (winners), 1904, 1905, 1906, 1907, 1909

References

English players of English billiards
Snooker players from Liverpool
English male golfers
Amateur golfers
1869 births
1961 deaths